Henrietta Davis is an American politician who served as the mayor of Cambridge, Massachusetts in 2012 and 2013. She was a member of the Cambridge City Council from 1996 to 2013, and a member of the Cambridge School Committee from 1988 to 1995.

Davis has focused on energy and the environment, non-auto transportation, neighborhood preservation, bridging the digital divide, children's health and quality living for seniors. She has attended the United Nations Climate Change Conference. She has received significant news coverage for proposing a limit on the size of soda and other sugar-sweetened beverages served at Cambridge restaurants, similar to the New York City soft drink size limit.

Before entering politics, Davis worked as a preschool administrator and as a journalist for Time, Life, Money and NPR. She has master's degrees in social work and public administration.

References

Mayors of Cambridge, Massachusetts
Harvard Kennedy School alumni
University of Rochester alumni
Boston College Graduate School of Social Work alumni
Women mayors of places in Massachusetts
Cambridge, Massachusetts City Council members
Cambridge, Massachusetts School Committee members
Living people
Year of birth missing (living people)
21st-century American women